Nama californicum is a species of flowering plant in the borage family known by the common name California fiddleleaf. It is native to much of California and parts of western Nevada, where it grows in several types of dry and sandy habitat in desert, mountain, and valley areas.

Description
It is a densely hairy annual plant forming a small patch on the ground with prostrate stems no more than 10 centimeters long. The small leaves are oval, widely lance-shaped, or spoon-shaped and coated in coarse or fine hairs. The inflorescence is a cluster of many tiny tubular flowers in shades of pale pink or white. Each five-lobed flower is about 2 millimeters wide.

External links
Calflora Database: Nama californicum (California fiddleleaf)
Jepson Manual eFlora treatment of Nama californicum (Lemmonia californica)
UC Photo gallery — Nama californicum

californicum
Flora of California
Flora of Nevada
Flora of the California desert regions
Flora of the Sierra Nevada (United States)
Natural history of the California chaparral and woodlands
Natural history of the Mojave Desert
Natural history of the Transverse Ranges
Flora without expected TNC conservation status